Aleksandr Nikolayevich Panov (born 6 July 1944) is a Russian diplomat.

Born in Moscow, Panov graduated from the Moscow State Institute of International Relations in 1968. He entered the diplomatic service immediately upon graduation.

Panov served in a number of important diplomatic posts for the Soviet Union and continued to serve his country as the Russian Federation. In 1992 he became the Ambassador of the Russian Federation to the Republic of Korea. In 1994 he returned to Russia to become the Deputy Foreign Minister. In 1996 he became the ambassador to Japan and in 2004 the ambassador to Norway.

References

Living people
1944 births
Moscow State Institute of International Relations alumni
Academic staff of the Diplomatic Academy of the Ministry of Foreign Affairs of the Russian Federation
Ambassador Extraordinary and Plenipotentiary (Russian Federation)
Ambassadors of Russia to South Korea
Ambassadors of Russia to Japan
Ambassadors of Russia to Norway